The Galactic Garden was a 1985 British television drama with a science fiction theme.

A pair of alien visitors to earth arrive in a seed shaped space-pod, and begin exploring the new world of a suburban garden.

The drama was produced by BBC Bristol, and included Andrew Sachs, Mona Bruce and Sarah Neville amongst its cast.  The director was John Downer, who also wrote the drama with Andrew Sachs.

External links 
 The Galactic Garden (available on YouTube in the UK)
  BFI entry

British science fiction television shows